ELN may refer to:

Paramilitary 
 National Liberation Army (Colombia), involved in the continuing Colombian armed conflict
 Ñancahuazú Guerrilla, a guerilla group active in the Cordillera Province, Bolivia from 1966 to 1967
 National Liberation Army (Peru), a guerilla group active in 1965

Science
 ELN (gene), coding for Elastin
 Electronic lab notebook

Other uses
 Bowers Airport, serving Ellensburg, Washington, United States
 East Lothian, historic county in Scotland, Chapman code
 Élan, an Irish pharmaceutical company
 Equity-linked note, a financial instrument
 European Leadership Network, a European think-tank
 Emerging Leaders Network, a program of Toronto-based CivicAction